George Deady Melican (born July 27, 1889) was an American football player and coach.  He served as the head football coach at Massachusetts Agricultural College—now the University of Massachusetts Amherst in 1916. He compiled a 2–4–2 record that season.

Head coaching record

References

1889 births
Year of death missing
American football quarterbacks
UMass Minutemen football coaches
UMass Minutemen football players
Coaches of American football from Massachusetts
Players of American football from Worcester, Massachusetts